Mongo (1959–1983) was an American Champion Thoroughbred racehorse that was most notable for his performances in turf races.

Background
He was bred and raced by Marion duPont Scott, a member of the prominent Du Pont family. His sire was imported British stallion Royal Charger, a son of Nearco, which Thoroughbred Heritage says was "one of the greatest racehorses of the Twentieth Century". Mongo's dam was Accra, Ms. Du Pont Scott's foundation mare, who produced at least seven other winners including the three-time American Champion Steeplechase Horse Neji.

Racing career
Frank Bonsal, a former jockey in steeplechase racing, conditioned Mongo for racing. As a three-year-old in 1962, the colt won important races on turf under jockey Charlie Burr. He notably won the Lexington Handicap, the first of two consecutive runnings of both the United Nations Handicap and the Trenton Handicap. The following year was Mongo's most successful. On November 11, he met the reigning American Horse of the Year Kelso, as well as challengers from France, Ireland, Hungary, Venezuela, and Russia in  the Washington, D.C. International Stakes. The race evolved into a match between Mongo and Kelso throughout the last half-mile. On the line, Mongo prevailed by half a length, but his win was only confirmed after the track stewards rejected a claim of interference brought by Ismael Valenzuela, the rider of the runner-up. As a result of his successes, Mongo was voted the 1963 American Champion Male Turf Horse.

Mongo also raced successfully at age five. He defeated Kelso again to win the 1964 Monmouth Handicap, defeated the outstanding runner Gun Bow in the John B. Campbell Handicap, and set a new Monmouth Park track record in winning the Trenton Handicap for the second time.

Stud career
Retired to stud at Blue Ridge Farm near Upperville, Virginia,  Mongo met with modest success. While none of his progeny met with his level of racing success, Mongo sired some good runners, including:
 Mongongo (1969) - winner of multiple stakes races including the Salvator Mile Handicap
 Bushongo (1971) - won Flamingo Stakes  
 Commadore C. (1976) - Long Branch Stakes winner
 Mongo Queen (b. 1976) - won Sorority Stakes

Mongo died at age 24 on March 21, 1983, at Blue Ridge Farm.

Pedigree

References

1959 racehorse births
1983 racehorse deaths
Racehorses bred in Virginia
Racehorses trained in the United States
Du Pont racehorses
American Champion racehorses
Thoroughbred family 21-a